Choroba is a surname. Notable people with the surname include:

 Jerzy Choroba (born 1949), Polish field hockey player
 Patrick Choroba (born 1996), German-Polish footballer

See also
 

Polish-language surnames